Zodarion abantense is a spider species found in Greece.

See also
 List of Zodariidae species

References

External links

attikaense
Spiders of Europe
Spiders described in 1980